Boston Basketball Partners L.L.C. is an American local private investment group formed to purchase the Boston Celtics of the National Basketball Association (NBA).

The executive committee consists of the four members of the managing board, Wyc Grousbeck, H. Irving Grousbeck, Stephen Pagliuca and The Abbey Group, represented by Robert Epstein with the additions of Paul Edgerley, Glenn Hutchins and James Pallotta. Other new key additions include Matt Levin, managing director, Bain Capital partners.

Boston Basketball Partners’ list of founding investors includes: Richard H. Aldrich, senior vice president and chief business officer, RA Capital Associates; David Bonderman, managing director, Texas Pacific Group; James Breyer, general partner, Accel Partners; James I. Cash, Jr., professor and senior associate dean, Harvard Business School; Paul Edgerley, managing director, Bain Capital Partners; William P. Egan, general partner, Alta Communications; William Helman, general partner, Greylock Partners; Glenn Hutchins, a founder and managing member of Silver Lake Partners; Stephen R. Lewinstein, president, Stephen R. Lewinstein Associates; Stephen J. Luczo, chairman and CEO, Seagate Technology; Michael Marks, chairman and CEO, Flextronics International; James Pallotta, a managing director of Tudor Investment Corporation and head of Tudor’s U.S. Equity Securities Group; David Roux, founder, Silver Lake Partners; and Mark Wan, partner, Three Arch Partners.

Owners
Wyc Grousbeck 
Stephen Pagliuca
Robert Epstein
Ellie Svenson
David Epstein
Matt Levin
David Bonderman
Jim Breyer
James Pallotta 
Glenn Hutchins
Paul Edgerley
Stephen Lewinstein
Jonathan Lavine

References

Boston Celtics owners
NBA articles needing images